Crane River is a community in the Canadian province of Manitoba. A designated place in Canadian census data, the community had a population of 128 in the Canada 2006 Census
The Reservation consists of 3 Councillors and 1 Chief, the reserve has all the basic needs like a Water Treatment Plant, A school for the kids inside of the community, a band office for the band members, a radio station that is mainly used for radio bingo, Health Centre, Daycare and headstart programs for the younger kids that cannot attend elementary school. The primary language used is English, most of the youth do not know how to speak Ojibway, we may have an understanding but we do not know how to speak the language and understand what is being said.  .

Demographics 

References

Designated places in Manitoba
Northern communities in Manitoba